St. Veit im Innkreis, also Sankt Veit im Innkreis is a municipality in the district of Braunau am Inn in the Austrian state of Upper Austria.

Geography
Sankt Veit lies in the Innviertel. About 9 percent of the municipality is forest and 85 farmland.

References

Cities and towns in Braunau am Inn District